Duck Creek may refer to:

 Duck Creek (Smyrna River tributary), a stream in Kent and New Castle Counties, Delaware
 Duck Creek (Barker Creek), a stream in Missouri
 Duck Creek (Upper Castor River), a stream in Missouri
 Duck Creek (Ohio)
 Duck Creek, Garland, Texas
Duck Creek (Trinity River tributary)
 Duck Creek, Utah
 Duck Creek (Wisconsin), a stream in Wisconsin
 Duck Creek (Quad Cities)
 Duck Creek Hundred, an unincorporated subdivision of Kent County, Delaware; see List of Delaware Hundreds.
 Duck Creek (Clyde, New South Wales)
 Duck Creek (Bogan River tributary), New South Wales, Australia
 Duck Creek Natural Area, a protected area of Rio Blanco County, Colorado, USA
 Taylors Creek, also known as Duck Creek, in Kentucky

See also
 Duck River (disambiguation)
 Duck (disambiguation)